Oreophryne brachypus is a species of frog in the family Microhylidae. It is endemic to the island of New Britain, in the Bismarck Archipelago of Papua New Guinea. Common name Gazelle cross frog has been coined for it.

Description
Adult males measure  and adult females  in snout–vent length. The snout rounded but approaching truncate in dorsal view. The eyes are prominent. The tympanum is small. The fingers and the toes have enlarged, grooved terminal disks. The fingers have basal webbing, and the toes are maximally half-webbed. The dorsum is smooth. The ground colour is dusky brown. There are indistinct and slightly darker markings, which commonly include a narrow transocular bar and a W-shaped patch immediately behind the head.

The male advertisement call is a long "squeak", lasting about four seconds and consisting of a single note.

Habitat and conservation
Males call from bushes and trees at night. Development is direct, without free-living tadpole stage. It is an abundant species. It might be locally impacted by logging, but it is an adaptable species. It is not known from any protected areas.

References

brachypus
Amphibians of Papua New Guinea
Endemic fauna of Papua New Guinea
Taxa named by Franz Werner
Amphibians described in 1898
Taxonomy articles created by Polbot